Štrach is a Czech surname. Notable people with the surname include:

Jiri Strach (born 1973), Czech film director and actor
Petr Štrach (born 1983), Czech ice hockey player

Czech-language surnames